Aspisoma ignitum is a species of firefly in the family Lampyridae. It is found in the Caribbean, Central America, North America, and South America. Its presence is uncertain in the United States.

References

Further reading

 
 
 
 
 
 
 

Lampyridae
Bioluminescent insects
Articles created by Qbugbot
Beetles described in 1767
Taxa named by Carl Linnaeus
Insects of the Dominican Republic
Insects of the Caribbean